Gertrude Le Brandt (July 1, 1863 in Illinois – August 28, 1955 in Hollywood) was an American silent film actress.

She entered film in 1916 in Youth's Endearing Charm with actors such as Mary Miles Minter and Harry von Meter.

Filmography
Mama's Affair (1921) as Bundy
Wild Oats (1919)
Through the Toils (1919) as Mrs. Tressler
Doing Their Bit (1918) as Bridget McCann O'Dowd
Rose of the World (1918) as Mary
Melissa of the Hills (1917) as Mrs. Sanders
Annie-for-Spite (1917) as Mrs. J.G. Nottingham
A Dream or Two Ago (1916)
Faith (1916) as Mrs. Stimson
Dulcie's Adventure (1916)
Youth's Endearing Charm (1916) as Mrs. Disbrow

References

External links

1863 births
1955 deaths
People from Illinois
American film actresses
American silent film actresses
Actresses from Illinois
20th-century American actresses